Redesdale railway station was the terminus of the Redesdale line. There were sheep yards at the station and a number of mills where firewood was cut and sent to Melbourne. Cream was often sent by rail to the Newstead Butter Factory.

It was mostly a goods station but serviced passengers by means of mixed-goods trains and railmotors. In 1920 Redesdale station saw 1,721 outgoing passengers, but this figure fell sharply over the next decade for the dissemination of private vehicles and decreasing population in the area. In 1930, only 41 passengers were carried. Demand decreased further following World War II, and the line closed on 29 June 1954.

On 3 November 1949 the railway turntable at the station snapped under the weight of the locomotive that was halfway through turning on it. The incident could be heard nearly a mile away.

References

Disused railway stations in Victoria (Australia)
Railway stations in Australia opened in 1891
Railway stations closed in 1954